Intro (in Macedonian: Интро) is the debut album by the Macedonian male group Bravo Band. The album was released in October 2008 and it contains nine songs which are different by style.

Production history
The first single released from the album was "Lesno Ti E Tebe" ("It's easy for you") in 2006. With that song the band first promoted their self as a music group on the Macedonian festival Ohrid Fest. The song is work of Jovan Jovanov and Elvir Mekic which made their second single too called "Ne Bih Te Menjao" ("I wouldn't change you"). "Ne Bih Te Menjao" is a Serbian language song and it was the band's entry for Suncane Skale 2007. With this song they finished third in the first night with 63 points. The video for the song "Neka Patam" made by Dejan Milicevic was selected for best Macedonian video of 2008. In October all since then present songs they released on an album. The album is called Intro mainly for two reasons. The first one is the word intro which comes from the English word "introduction". It is just a metaphor for what they present in it, an introduction of their emotions which are in one way or another expressed in every song. The second reason for the name is that the album itself is meant to be an introduction into something new, something previously unseen by them.

Songs
"Sam Megju Dzidovi"
music: B. Gjoševskiarrangement: B. Gjoševskilyrics: S. Gjoševska
"Hronichno Lud"
music: B. Gjoševskiarrangement: B. Gjoševskilyrics: S. Gjoševska
"Bidi Iskrena"
music: J. Vasilevski, M. Dimikj, G. Simonoski arrangement: B. Gjoševskilyrics: V. Malinova
"Po Godina Dve"
music: L. Cvetkovskiarrangement: L. Cvetkovskilyrics: M. Milanov
"Lesno Ti E Tebe"
music: J. Jovanovarrangement: J. Jovanovlyrics: E. Mekic
"Ti Si Vo Mene"
music: J. Vasilevskiarrangement: G. Simonoskilyrics: J. Vasilevski
"Ne Bih Te Menjao"
music: J. Jovanovarrangement: J. Jovanovlyrics: E. Mekic
"Neka Patam"
music: A. Tasevskiarrangement:  J. Jovanovlyrics: E. Mekic
"Bilo Kako Bilo"
music: L. Cvetkovskiarrangement: L. Cvetkovskilyrics: M. Milanov

Awards
Ne Bih Te Menjao - 3rd place on Suncane Skale 2007 - Bronzena Sirena
Neka Patam - the best video for 2008 on "Golden Bug Of Popularity"
Hronichno Lud - 12 points from televoting on Ohrid Fest 2008

References

2008 albums
Bravo Band albums